Kurosh may refer to:
Cyrus the Great (Persian: Kurosh Bozorg)
Aleksandr Gennadievich Kurosh, a Russian mathematician
Kourosh (disambiguation), various meanings including a common Persian given name